Hans Erland Oskar Colliander (18 April 1924 – 18 October 2013), was a Swedish diplomat.

Career
Colliander was born in Uppsala, Sweden, the son of senior librarian Elof Colliander and his wife Harriet (née Lejdström). He received a Candidate of Law degree from Uppsala University in 1946 and a diploma from the Stockholm School of Economics in 1949 before he took up employment at Skandinaviska Banken in 1949. Colliander became an attaché at the Ministry for Foreign Affairs in 1950 and served in Washington, D.C. and Paris 1952–57. He then served at the Foreign Ministry from 1957 to 1961, in Moscow 1961–65 and again at the Foreign Ministry 1965–69. Colliander was then counsellor in the Swedish delegation in Geneva 1969–76, director of the Swedish OECD delegation in Paris 1976–85 and Swedish ambassador in Athens from 1985 to 1989.

He was representative and chairman of the trade and aviation negotiations with various countries and was the chairman of the OECD Steel Commission 1980–85, and again from 1989. Colliander was also a consultant at the Federation of Swedish Industries (Sveriges Industriförbund) from 1990. Colliander was a board member of the Association for Friends of the Swedish Athens Institute.

Personal life
Colliander was married 1950–74 to Kerstin Fredriksson (born 1923). He was then married to Hilda Marti. Colliander died in 2013 and was buried in Norra begravningsplatsen in Stockholm.

References

1924 births
2013 deaths
Ambassadors of Sweden to Greece
People from Uppsala
Uppsala University alumni
Stockholm School of Economics alumni
Burials at Norra begravningsplatsen
Swedish expatriates in the United States
Swedish expatriates in France
Swedish expatriates in the Soviet Union
Swedish expatriates in Switzerland